One Strange Rock is an American television documentary series, produced by Nutopia in conjunction with Darren Aronofsky, which premiered on National Geographic on March 26, 2018. On July 25, 2018, National Geographic renewed the series for a second season. Season 2 was expected to premiere in March 2020 on National Geographic, but was reworked into a new series in 2021 called Welcome to Earth.

Premise 
One Strange Rock tells the story of how life survives and thrives on planet Earth, as told by eight astronauts from their unique perspective of being away from Earth (for about 1000 days).

Cast 
Hosted by actor Will Smith, One Strange Rock features contributions from astronauts Chris Hadfield, Nicole Stott, Jeffrey A. Hoffman, Mae Jemison, Leland Melvin, Mike Massimino, Jerry Linenger, and Peggy Whitson.

Episodes

Release
The documentary was released on Netflix streaming on February 1, 2019. In the United States, it left Netflix for Disney+ on January 1, 2020.

References

External links 
 
 
 
 

2010s American documentary television series
2018 American television series debuts
National Geographic (American TV channel) original programming